The roughnose wedgefish (Rhynchobatus cooki) is a species of fish in the Rhinidae family. It is found in Indonesia (off Java) and Singapore. Its natural habitats are open seas, shallow seas, coral reefs, estuarine waters, and coastal saline lagoons. It is threatened by habitat loss. Despite having been known for more than a decade, it remained undescribed until 2016. Adults are greenish-brown above; young have white spots.

The fish is named in honor of  Sidney F. Cook (1953-1997), a shark fisheries biologist, and a leader in shark conservation.

Sources

roughnose wedgefish
Taxa named by Leonard Compagno
Taxa named by Peter R. Last
Taxa named by Peter M Kyne
roughnose wedgefish
Taxonomy articles created by Polbot